Naik may refer to:
 Naik (military rank), the equivalent to corporal in the Indian and Pakistan Armies and formerly in the British Indian Army
 Naik, Iran, a village in Sistan and Baluchestan Province
 Naik, South Khorasan, a village in South Khorasan Province
 Naic, Cavite (previously Naik), a municipality in the province of Cavite, Philippines.
 The community with origins in India, also known as Aheria
 Naik Maratha, a Marathi speaking community found in Sindhudurg district of Maharashtra, Karnataka, Telangana and neighboring Pernem
 Namadhari Naik, a Hindu community who follow Vaishnavism

People
 A. M. Naik, chairman and managing director of Larsen & Toubro Limited
 Anuradha N. Naik, Indian botanist
 Ganesh Naik, Indian politician
 Jayant Pandurang Naik (1907–1981), Indian educator
 Kullal Chickappu Naik (Born 1903) Indian agriculture scientist
 Ram Naik (born 1934), governor of Uttar Pradesh, India
 Shripad Yasso Naik (born 1952), Indian politician
 Zakir Naik, Islamic televangelist (born 1965)

See also
 Anavil Brahmin
 Naiker, a title used across India
 Nayak (disambiguation)